Venganza, Spanish for "vengeance", may refer to:

Venganza (album), a 2005 album by Mexican death metal band Hacavitz
¡Venganza!, a 2009 album by rock band My Chemical Romance
Venganza (TV series), Colombia (2017)

See also
La venganza (disambiguation)
Vengeance (disambiguation)